Bhadreswar may refer to:
Bhadreswar, Hooghly, a town in Hooghly district, West Bengal, India
Bhadreswar, Kutch, a village in Kutch district, Gujarat, India